Shri Isam Singh a politician from Bahujan Samaj Party and was a former Member of the Parliament of India representing Uttar Pradesh in the Rajya Sabha, the upper house of the Indian Parliament.

References

Living people
Rajya Sabha members from Uttar Pradesh
Bahujan Samaj Party politicians from Uttar Pradesh
Year of birth missing (living people)